The Mont Mézenc is a summit of the Massif Central, France.

Description 
Located at the altitude of 1753 m (5751 feet) - for the South Summit, and 1744 m (5722 feet) for the North Summit - in the department of Haute-Loire, Auvergne-Rhône-Alpes, France, it's the highest point of the department (and of the department of Ardèche). The Mont Mézenc has a volcanic origin. It's a dome of phonolite dating 7 million years.

References 

Auvergne-Rhône-Alpes
Haute-Loire
Massif Central